Michigan v. Moseley, 423 U.S. 96 (1975), was a United States Supreme Court case in which the Court held that a criminal suspect's assertion of his right to remain silent after a Miranda warning does not preclude the police from re-Mirandizing him and questioning him about a different crime.

Richard Bert Mosley was arrested in Michigan in connection with several robberies. Police Mirandized him and asked him questions about the robberies. He eventually asserted his right to remain silent and interrogation ceased. A few hours later, while Mosley was still being held, another officer interrogated him regarding a homicide. The officer read Mosley a fresh Miranda warning and Mosley then made statements that incriminated him. The Court held that the questioning on a different crime did not violate Mosley's right to remain silent. The Court reasoned that his Fifth Amendment rights were scrupulously honored when he ended questioning about the robberies. Given the significant time lapse and the fresh set of Miranda warnings, there was no violation of Mosley's Fifth Amendment rights.

External links
 

United States Supreme Court cases
1975 in United States case law
Legal history of Michigan
United States Supreme Court cases of the Burger Court